Melaporphyria is a genus of moths of the family Noctuidae.

Species
 Melaporphyria immortua Grote, 1874

References
Natural History Museum Lepidoptera genus database
Melaporphyria at funet

Heliothinae